Oh Manapenne! is a 2021 Indian Tamil-language romantic comedy film directed by Kaarthikk Sundar in his directorial debut and written by Deepak Sundarrajan. A remake of the Telugu film Pelli Choopulu (2016), it stars Harish Kalyan and Priya Bhavani Shankar as a boy and girl who meet during a matchmaking event. How their aspirations bring them together forms the rest of the story.

The rights to remake Pelli Choopulu in Tamil were initially acquired by Gautham Vasudev Menon in 2016, and the film titled Pon Ondru Kandein was to be directed by Senthil Veerasamy, with Vishnu Vishal and Tamannaah starring. The project faced delays and was ultimately shelved due to budgetary constraints; by November 2019, it had undergone a complete change in cast and crew. The new film, Oh Manapenne!, began principal photography in December 2019 and wrapped in February 2020. It was released on 22 October 2021 via Disney+ Hotstar.

Plot 
Karthik is a guy who completes his B.E by clearing his subjects for almost five years, but he is also lazy and incapable of doing any work. His dream is to become a chef and open a restaurant, but he doesn't get any support from his father. Shruthi is a very focused girl who works hard to fulfil her dreams of going to Australia. However, her father shows no interest, as she is a girl and he wanted a boy instead. When both of them meet at the matchmaking event, her younger cousin, Barath, accidentally locks the door which jams very often and they get stuck eventually. To pass time, they talk about their past.

Shruthi reveals that she was in love with a man named Arjun. They both wanted to start a food truck business. Arjun went to Bangalore to talk with his father about their love and business. Meanwhile, Shruthi started her plan eagerly, and was ready to surprise Arjun by buying the truck. But things went wrong and Arjun did not come back, overpowered by greed of getting dowry. Shruthi and her father waited for him but when they realised Arjun wasn't coming back, her father decided to get her married to someone else.

On his turn, Karthik reveals that he was unemployed and always went out with his two friends Sathya and Faizal. So Karthik and his friends, make cooking videos, as he is passionate about cooking. But it wasn't profitable enough. So they plan to make prank videos and were caught red-handed by Karthik's father, which ended their plan.

It is then revealed, after the door was fixed, that Karthik came to the wrong address for his matchmaking event. Later, Karthik goes to his actual matchmaking event, which was with a rich family. Meanwhile, Shruthi tells the guy coming to her matchmaking event that she's not interested in the marriage. The family of Karthik's bride wanted him to be able to run a business, so he and Shruthi decide to operate the food truck themselves, with Karthik as the chef, and Shruthi in charge of the business side of things. At first, they face many difficulties, mainly because of Karthik and his friends' laziness as well as fighting with Shruthi and giving up the food truck.

Later, Karthik visits Shruthi's house and informs her father that he should be proud to have such a responsible daughter. He also claims that if he ever gets a son like him, that he would wish to have a daughter like Shruthi and insists him to let her pursue her dreams. Because of this, Shruthi understands the good nature of Karthik and later convinces Karthi's father that he is a talented cook by cooking them Karthik's recipe. Then they kickstart their business with the support from both their parents. After this, their food truck becomes a smashing success. In the process, they fall in love without realising it, but both of them are engaged to other people, so they drift apart. After realising they love each other, they come back together through a radio show organised by Shruthi's friend Ramya. With the support of their family and friends, Karthik and Shruthi reunite successfully.

Cast 

 Harish Kalyan as Karthik
 Priya Bhavani Shankar as Shruthi
 Venu Arvind as Karthik's father
 Anbuthasan as Sathya
 Abishek Kumar as Faizal
 K. S. G. Venkatesh as Shruthi's father
 Ashwin Kumar Lakshmikanthan as Arjun
 Samyuktha Viola Viswanathan as Aditi
 Anish Kuruvilla as Aditi's father
 Siddhanth as the chef

Production

Pre-production 
In late October 2016, Gautham Vasudev Menon bought the rights to remake the Telugu film Pelli Choopulu (2016) in Tamil, under his banner Ondraga Entertainment. The film was titled Pon Ondru Kandein, and was to be directed by Menon's assistant Senthil Veerasamy. In March 2017, Menon chose Vishnu Vishal and Tamannaah as the lead actors. S. R. Kathir was chosen as the cinematographer, with Darbuka Siva and Praveen Anthony as the music composer and editor respectively. Though Vishal anticipated that filming would begin in July or August 2017, the start of filming faced repeated delays, and ultimately by December, Vishal opted out of the project as he could no longer allot new dates due to the delays. Followed by the uncertainty prevailing over the film's lead cast after Vishal's exit, adding to the reason was budgetary constraints which prompted Menon to shelve the project.

Development 
Though Menon initially planned on reviving the project with a new cast and lower budget, by November 2019 the project had undergone a complete change in cast and crew. The new film was jointly produced by A Studios LLP, A Havish Production, SP Cinemas, Madhav Media and Third Eye Entertainment, with Kaarthikk Sundar, a former associate of A. L. Vijay, making his directorial debut, and Satyanarayana Koneru and Ramesh Varma Penmesta handling production duties. The screenplay was written by Deepak Sundarrajan, cinematography was handled by Krishnan Vasant, and editing by Kripakaran. The title Oh Manapenne! was revealed on 1 October 2020, derived from the song of the same name from Vinnaithaandi Varuvaayaa (2010). Kaarthikk said, "We wanted to have a title that refers to weddings/matchmaking. The names that we had zeroed in on were either too old or not interesting enough", but when he was listening to the song, he chose that as the film's title. Kaarthikk chose not to do a shot-for-shot remake, but kept the original film's essence, and added, "Since Southern States have many commonalities, there was not much to change".

Casting 
In November 2019, Harish Kalyan was announced as the lead actor, and a month later Priya Bhavani Shankar as the lead actress. In a December 2019 interview, Kaarthikk said that after watching Pelli Choopulu, he told Harish he would be a "perfect fit" as the lead actor if the film was to be remade in Tamil. In an October 2020 interview, Kaarthikk said that when he thought of the lead characters of Pelli Choopulu, Harish and Priya came to his mind and he was convinced they could pull off the roles of a "boy-next-door" and "bossy character" respectively with conviction. In preparation for his role as a chef, Harish learnt cooking from Siddhanth, the owner of the barbecue food truck Spitfire BBQ, on whose life the original film was based. The team also approached Siddhanth to play a minor role. The film is the feature debut of theatre actor Abishek Kumar, who Kaarthik cast because of their friendship and Kaarthik's belief that he was a "natural actor". Abishek said he sought to avoid deep preparation and method acting, but that he was "just trying to fit the role in the most natural way possible".

Filming 
Principal photography began on 11 December 2019, and wrapped in February 2020, a week before the COVID-19 lockdown in India was announced. Post-production works began soon after filming wrapped. According to Kaarthikk, "The lockdown only helped us as we could patiently edit and get it done".

Music 
The soundtrack was composed by Vishal Chandrashekhar. It consists of four songs and two instrumentals. The song "Lazy Song" fuses Carnatic music with the western blues and jazz genres. It was released on 26 February 2021 as a single. Another single "Bodhai Kaname" was released on 30 July 2021. The third single "Aao Ji Aao" was released on 15 October 2021.

Release and reception 
Oh Manapenne! was released on 22 October 2021 via Disney+ Hotstar. M. Suganth of The Times of India called it "a worthy remake that is as charming and delightful" as the Telugu original. Ashameera Aiyappan of Firstpost said Oh Manapenne! "is a light, breezy film about love and aspirations. It might work better if watched as a stand-alone film, without the lingering presence of Pelli Choopulu looming ahead of it".

References

External links 
 

2020s Tamil-language films
2021 directorial debut films
2021 romantic comedy films
Cooking films
Disney+ Hotstar original films
Films about chefs
Films about Indian weddings
Films about trucks
Films scored by Vishal Chandrasekhar
Indian romantic comedy films
Tamil remakes of Telugu films